The Party of Hope is a political party in Morocco.

In the parliamentary election, held on 7 September 2007, the party did not win any seats.

Political parties in Morocco